Stephen G. Harding is an attorney and American politician from the state of Connecticut. He is the senator for the 30th Senate District and is a member of the Republican Party. He is currently serving his first term, and was elected in November 2022. From 2015-2023, he was the representative for the 107th General Assembly District covering Brookfield, as well as parts of Bethel and Danbury.

References

Living people
Connecticut Republicans
Year of birth missing (living people)
21st-century American politicians
New York Law School alumni
Albertus Magnus College alumni
People from Brookfield, Connecticut